Scottish Unionist Party may refer to:
 Unionist Party (Scotland) (1912-1965), sometimes known outside Scotland as the Scottish Unionist Party
 Scottish Unionist Party (1986), a small political party in Scotland, from the mid-1980s to the present day

See also
Scottish Conservative and Unionist Party
Unionism in Scotland